Lego Rock Band is a 2009 music video game developed by Harmonix and Traveller's Tales, and published by MTV Games and Warner Bros. Interactive Entertainment. The game, the fourth major console release in the Rock Band series, was released in November 2009 for the Xbox 360, PlayStation 3, Wii, and Nintendo DS. Lego Rock Band allows one to four players to simulate the playing of rock music by providing the players with peripherals modeled after musical instruments. These include a guitar peripheral for lead guitar and bass gameplay, a drum kit peripheral, and a microphone.

Lego Rock Bands soundtrack has been selected to be "suitable for younger audiences". All songs available in Lego Rock Band are compatible with previous entries in the Rock Band series and until 2014, could be exported to these games for $9.99 along with the use of a unique code included on a paper insert included in the game case.

Announcement
When Lego Rock Band was officially announced on 21 April 2009, only five songs were confirmed to be included: "Song 2" by Blur, "Kung Fu Fighting" by Carl Douglas, "The Final Countdown" by Europe, "Girls & Boys" by Good Charlotte, and "So What" by Pink. Wired published leaked information from "a highly-placed source close to Harmonix" on 31 August, which included the names of thirteen songs which would be included in Lego Rock Band. Additional songs were officially announced closer to the game's release date, including "The Passenger" by Iggy Pop and "Let's Dance" by David Bowie. The full setlist was revealed on 12 October.

Main setlist 
The Nintendo DS version of the game features a 25-song subset of the 45 songs in the console versions as listed below.

Downloadable songs

Lego Rock Band also supports existing downloadable content from the Rock Band series, as well as songs exported from other Rock Band titles that has been "identified to be suitable for all ages", except in the Wii version; however, songs released after Rock Band 3 are not compatible with Lego Rock Band.  The Lego Rock Band Music Store only includes Rock Band songs which have been cleared for use in the game. Also, any exported content from the original Rock Band and its Track Packs deemed "Family Friendly" can be used in the game. Users do not need to be signed in to use content that was downloaded on another account, as long as it is on the same console system, thus allowing a child's account to access the filtered set of music from a parent's account library.

Reception
Eurogamer reviewer Keza MacDonald called Lego Rock Bands setlist "an unusual selection ... but undeniably varied", but was disappointed by the small number of songs. Game Informers Bryan Vore referred to the setlist as being "weak", with "several throwaway tracks you’ll forget the instant they’re over." Jack DeVries, a reviewer for IGN, felt that the game has a varied setlist, but not enough songs compared to Rock Band 2 and Band Hero.

References

External links
 Lego Rock Band official website

Rock Band soundtracks
Lists of songs in music video games
Rock Band